

233001–233100 

|-bgcolor=#f2f2f2
| colspan=4 align=center | 
|}

233101–233200 

|-bgcolor=#f2f2f2
| colspan=4 align=center | 
|}

233201–233300 

|-id=292
| 233292 Brianschmidt || 2006 BV || Brian Schmidt (born 1967), American physicist, who won the who the Nobel Prize for the discovery of the accelerating expansion of the universe, using supernovae as standard candles || 
|}

233301–233400 

|-id=383
| 233383 Assisneto ||  || Vicente Ferreira de Assis Neto (1936–2004), a Brazilian amateur astronomer. || 
|}

233401–233500 

|-id=472
| 233472 Moorcroft ||  || Donald Ross Moorcroft (born 1935), a Canadian physicist. || 
|-id=488
| 233488 Cosandey || 2006 YG || David A. Cosandey (born 1965) is a Swiss physicist. He has developed a theory of science explaining the rises and declines of the main scientific disciplines, including astronomy, in the history of the West, the Middle East, India and China. || 
|}

233501–233600 

|-id=522
| 233522 Moye ||  || Marcel Moye (1873–1939), a founding member of the Flammarion Astronomical Society of Montpellier, which administered the Babote Observatory from 1902 to 1922. || 
|-id=547
| 233547 Luxun ||  || Lu Xun (or Lu Hsün), the pen name of Zhou Shuren (1881–1936), one of the major Chinese writers of the twentieth century. || 
|-id=559
| 233559 Pizzetti ||  || Gianpaolo Pizzetti (born 1961), an Italian amateur astronomer and discoverer of minor planets at the Lumezzane Observatory  || 
|}

233601–233700 

|-id=653
| 233653 Rether ||  || Hagen Rether (born 1969), a Romanian-born German political cabaret artist who studied music at the Folkwang University of the Arts || 
|-id=661
| 233661 Alytus ||  || The city of Alytus in southern Lithuania || 
|}

233701–233800 

|-id=707
| 233707 Alfons ||  || Emmanuel Peterfalvi (born 1967), known as "Alfons", is a French-German cabaret artist. || 
|}

233801–233900 

|-id=880
| 233880 Urbanpriol ||  || Urban Priol (born 1961), a German cabaret artist. || 
|-id=893
| 233893 Honthyhanna ||  || Hanna Honthy (1893–1978), a Hungarian opera singer and actress. || 
|}

233901–234000 

|-id=943
| 233943 Falera ||  || The Swiss mountain village of Falera, location of the Mirasteilas Observatory where this asteroid was discovered || 
|-id=967
| 233967 Vierkant ||  || Gisela Vierkant (1919–), mother of the discoverer Rainer Kracht || 
|}

References 

233001-234000